Bavayia septuiclavis , also known as Sadlier's New Caledonian gecko or the pale-stripe bavayia, is a gecko endemic to southern Grande Terre in New Caledonia.

References

Bavayia
Reptiles described in 1989
Taxa named by Ross Allen Sadlier
Geckos of New Caledonia